Ciubotaru, Ciobotariu  or Ciubotarul is a Romanian-language occupational surname derived from the occupation of ciubotar, bootmaker, a borrowing from Slavic 'Chebotar'

The surnames may refer to

Plaintiff in Ciubotaru v. Moldova
Alexandru Ciubotaru, director of the Chișinău Botanical Garden
Ionel Ciubotaru, mayor of Roznov, Neamț
Liviu Ciobotariu,  Romanian footballer
Cristian Ciubotariu,  Romanian footballer

Occupational surnames
Romanian-language surnames